The Moving Ahead for Progress in the 21st Century Act (MAP-21) is a funding and authorization bill to govern United States federal surface transportation spending. It was passed by Congress on June 29, 2012, and President Barack Obama signed it on July 6. The vote was 373–52 in the House of Representatives and 74–19 in the Senate.

The $105 billion two-year bill does not significantly alter total funding from the previous authorization, but does include many significant reforms. The Congressional Budget Office estimates that enacting MAP-21 will reduce the federal budget deficit over the 2012–22 period by $16.3 billion.

Key provisions
 The number of funding programs is consolidated by two-thirds.
 The environmental review process is reformed in an effort to speed up project development.  More projects will be categorically excluded from review, and there will be a four-year review deadline enforced with financial penalties.  (In 2011 the average review took 8.1 years.)
 Funding for bicycle and pedestrian transportation (primarily via rail trails) is reduced and consolidated into a broader program called "Transportation Alternatives." Half of this funding will go to metropolitan planning organizations and the other half will go to states, which may choose to use the funds for other purposes. Bicycle and rail trail advocates were highly critical of this change, anticipating a 60-70% drop in funding.
 A national freight policy will be developed.
 Tolling on federal highways is reformed. Mainstream tolling is now easier to implement in regards to new highways and expansion and repairs to existing ones. Also, electronic toll collection facilities had until October 1, 2016, to establish a nationwide interoperability agreement.  No funding was provided, and no penalty was set for not meeting this deadline, and  it has not been met.  (See List of electronic toll collection systems.)

Other provisions
Several unrelated provisions were attached to the bill: a one-year extension of federal student loan rates through June 30, 2013; a five-year reauthorization of the National Flood Insurance Program through 2017; and a one-year extension to the Secure Rural Schools Act, which compensates rural counties for loss of revenue caused by reduced timber harvest on federal lands. The bill also contains a provision allowing the State Department to revoke, deny, or limit passports for anyone the Internal Revenue Service certifies as having "a seriously delinquent tax debt in an amount in excess of $50,000." The Act also made further changes to the Uniform Relocation Assistance and Real Property Acquisition Act.

Revenue sources
MAP-21 is funded without increasing transportation user fees. (The federal gas tax was last raised in 1993.)  Instead, funds were generated through the following measures:
 Repeal a requirement that the Department of Transportation reimburse the difference in cost between shipping foreign food aid on a U.S.-flag vessel and a foreign-flag vessel
 Raise additional revenue by increasing the ability of business with excess assets in their pension funds to use them for retiree health and life insurance benefits, and by defining businesses that make roll-your-own machines available for consumer use as tobacco manufacturers
 Change the interest rate that pension plans use to measure their liabilities, increase pension premium rates for both variable and flat rate premium paid to the Pension Benefit Guaranty Corporation and establish a cap on the variable rate premium
 Allow eligible federal employees to enter into a phased retirement, during which they continue to work part-time while drawing a partial salary and a partial civil service annuity

References

External links
 MAP-21 as amended (PDF/details) in the GPO Statute Compilations collection
 MAP-21 as enacted in the US Statutes at Large

United States federal transportation legislation
Acts of the 112th United States Congress
2012 in American law